Sibiu Municipal Stadium is a multi-purpose stadium in Sibiu, Romania. FC Hermannstadt is the ground's tenant. The facility will also be used for a variety of other activities such as track and field and events.

The stadium was inaugurated on December 10th, 2022, when the local team from Sibiu, FC Hermannstadt played against the Liga 1 1st placed team, FCV Farul Constanța, trained by Romanian superstar Gheorghe Hagi.

See also
List of football stadiums in Romania

References

 

FC Hermannstadt 
Football venues in Romania
Buildings and structures in Sibiu
Multi-purpose stadiums in Romania
21st century in Romania